Puman Tira (Aymara puma cougar, tira cradle, -n(i) a suffix, "the cradle with (or of) a puma", also spelled Pumantira) is a mountain in the Andes of Peru, about  high . It is located in the Cusco Region, Canchis Province, on the border of the districts of Checacupe and Pitumarca. Puman Tira lies between Phatanka in the southeast and Wampuni in the northwest.

References

Mountains of Peru
Mountains of Cusco Region